ISR may refer to:

Organizations
 Institute for Strategy and Reconciliation
 Institutional and Scientific Relations, of the European Commission
 International Star Registry, a company selling the right to name stars
 ISR International School on the Rhine, Germany

Publications
 ISR, a socialist magazine, 1900-1918
 Information Systems Research
 International Socialist Review (disambiguation), U.S. publications
 International Statistical Review
 International Studies Review
 Israel Studies Review

Science and technology

Biology
 In-stent restenosis, recurrence of stenosis after stenting
Plant-induced systemic resistance, plant response to infection

Computers
 In-Service Register or Interrupt Service Register, in a PIC
 Interrupt handler or interrupt service routine

Other science
 In-situ recovery, a mining technique
 Incoherent scatter radar, for studying the ionosphere
 Intersecting Storage Rings, a particle collider at CERN

Other uses
 ISR, country code for Israel
 Indiana Southwestern Railway, US
 Inuvialuit Settlement Region,  Northwest Territories, Canada
 Ipoh-KL Sentral Route, a train service, Malaysia
 ISR Racing, a team from Czech Republic
 Israir (designator ISR), an Israeli airline
 Italian Social Republic, 1943–1945
 Joint Functional Component Command for Intelligence, Surveillance and Reconnaissance, of the US Strategic Command
 Intelligence, surveillance and reconnaissance, in military intelligence
 International Search Report, in international patent law